Berthelot may refer to:

People with the surname
 Amable Berthelot (1777–1847), Québécois lawyer and political figure
 André Berthelot (1862–1938), a secretary-general of La Grande Encyclopédie
 Anne Berthelot (born 1957), French professor of Medieval literature studies
 Armond J. Berthelot (1894–1961), French World War I flying ace
 Chantal Berthelot, member of the French National Assembly for French Guiana (2007–2017)
 Charles Honoré Berthelot La Villeheurnois (c. 1750-1799), French politician
 Francis Berthelot (born 1946), French science fiction author
 Henri Mathias Berthelot (1861–1931), French general during World War I
 Jean-Michel Berthelot (1945–2006), French sociologist and philosopher
 Jeanne Agnès Berthelot de Pléneuf, marquise de Prie (1698–1727)
 Marcellin Berthelot (1827–1907) chemist, author and diplomat
 Marco Berthelot (born 1972), Canadian curler
 Michel-Amable Berthelot Dartigny (1738–1815), Canadian politician
 Philippe Berthelot (1866–1934), French diplomat
 Pierre Berthelot (born 1943), French mathematician
 René Berthelot (? – 1664), French actor from Molière's troupe, known as Du Parc and Gros René
 Sabin Berthelot (1794–1880), French naturalist and ethnologist
 Sébastien Berthelot, French judoka, participant in the 2008-2009 European Championships
 Sophie Berthelot (1837–1907), wife of Marcellin and mother of André and Philippe, first woman interred in the Panthéon

Places
Berthelot River (Mégiscane River), a tributary of the Mégiscane River in Quebec, Canada
Berthelot Lake (Mégiscane River), Quebec, Canada
Avenue Berthelot, an avenue in the city of Lyon, France

See also
 Berthelot's reagent in analytical chemistry, invented by Marcellin Berthelot
 General Berthelot, a Romanian commune named after Henri Mathias Berthelot, previously named Berthelot

French-language surnames